Jigar or Jeegar  , used in [gujrati] and English-language communities. Jigar is also an Urdu slang name for friend. The name has a Persian background and history. The meaning of Jigar is kind-hearted. In the Hindi, Jigar is also used as a symbol of love and affection. In Hindi, Jigar is also synonymous with courage. It has a FirstName Ranking of 16,796 of 2,903,037 on the WhitePages database.

Jigar may refer to:Jig

Literature
 Jigar Moradabadi, Poet

Music

 Kumar Sanu's song Dil Jigar Nazar Kya Hai.
 Omkara song Beedi Jalailey Jigar se piya...
 Ladies vs Ricky Bahl song Jigar Da Tukda

Television and film
 Jigar, Bollywood 1992 Indian film directed by Farogh Siddique.

See also
 Jigar

References

Given names
Indian given names
English given names